St. Aloysius Institute of Education was established by the Society of Jesus in 2006. It is coeducational and affiliated to Mangalore University.

In 2017, students have achieved high ranks on the B.Ed. examination of Mangalore University.

See also
 List of Jesuit sites

References  

Colleges of Mangalore University
Jesuit universities and colleges in India
Universities and colleges in Mangalore
Educational institutions established in 2006
2006 establishments in Karnataka